Ficus opposita is one of several fig species commonly known as sandpaper figs. It is native to the Northern Territory and Queensland in Australia.Other common names include sweet sandpaper fig, sweet fig and the ambiguous "figwood" and "watery fig".

It grows as either a shrub or small tree. 
As the figs ripen, their colour changes from green to yellow to reddish-brown and finally, to black. The fruit is edible and palatable, tastier than most other fig species.

It serves as a food plant for the caterpillars of the Queensland butterfly the common- or purple moonbeam (Philiris innotatus).

The leaves on this plant can treat skin infections such as tinea.

Shown to hybridise with Ficus coronulata.

References

opposita
Rosales of Australia
Trees of Australia
Flora of the Northern Territory
Flora of Queensland
Drought-tolerant trees